Falsitromina bella is a species of sea snail, a marine gastropod mollusk in the family Cominellidae.

References

External links

Cominellidae
Gastropods described in 1951